Robert "Whit" Holcomb-Faye (born September 19, 1984) is a retired American professional basketball player. Holcomb-Faye played ten seasons as a professional player in several other hemispheres.

Career
Holcomb-Faye played for multiple German teams from the 2. Basketball Bundesliga and one team from Austria before signing with Aris Leeuwarden in the summer of 2012. Holcomb-Faye was one of the main reasons the team reached the Dutch finals for the first time in its history, as he averaged 14.5 points and 5.6 assist per game in the play-offs. In the Finals Leeuwarden lost to ZZ Leiden, the team he would later sign with. For the 2014–15 season, he signed with VOO Wolves Verviers-Pepinster.

Honours and titles

Club
Mitteldeutscher BC
 ProA: 2011–12

Individual
 DBL assists leader: 2012–13
 DBL All-Star: 2013

References

1984 births
Living people
American expatriate basketball people in Austria
American expatriate basketball people in Belgium
American expatriate basketball people in Germany
American expatriate basketball people in the Netherlands
American men's basketball players
Aris Leeuwarden players
B.S. Leiden players
Basketball players from Winston-Salem, North Carolina
Dutch Basketball League players
Flyers Wels players
Medi Bayreuth players
Mitteldeutscher BC players
Point guards
Radford Highlanders men's basketball players
RBC Pepinster players
Tigers Tübingen players